The Municipality of Nazarje is a municipality in Slovenia. It lies along the Dreta River. The seat of the municipality is the town of Nazarje. The area belongs to the traditional region of Styria and it is now included in the Savinja Statistical Region. The municipality was established on 3 October 1994, when the former larger Municipality of Mozirje was subdivided into the municipalities of Gornji Grad, Ljubno, Luče, Mozirje, and Nazarje. On 6 August 1998 the settlement of Prihova was transferred from the Municipality of Mozirje to the Municipality of Nazarje.

Settlements
In addition to the municipal seat of Nazarje, the municipality also includes the following settlements:

 Brdo
 Čreta pri Kokarjah
 Dobletina
 Kokarje
 Lačja Vas
 Potok
 Prihova
 Pusto Polje
 Rovt pod Menino
 Šmartno ob Dreti
 Spodnje Kraše
 Volog
 Zavodice
 Žlabor

References

External links

Municipality of Nazarje on Geopedia

 
Nazarje
1994 establishments in Slovenia